Mount Cooper is a prominent  glaciated mountain summit located in the Selkirk Mountains of southeast British Columbia, Canada. Mt. Cooper is the highest peak in the Goat Range and Slocan Ranges, which are subsets of the Selkirks. The nearest higher peak is Truce Mountain,  to the east-northeast. The first ascent of Mount Cooper was made August 10, 1962, by William Boulton, Terry Beck, Richard Hahn, Lorna Ream, Jack Steele, Edward Bouttin and Gary Johnson via the Spokane Glacier. This climbing party was from the Spokane Mountaineers organization. The mountain was named in association with Cooper Creek, which in turn was named after an 1880s Kaslo prospector and trapper. The mountain's name was officially adopted June 9, 1960, when approved by the Geographical Names Board of Canada. Prior to  1960 it was called Cooper Mountain.

Climate

Based on the Köppen climate classification, Mount Cooper has a subarctic climate with cold, snowy winters, and mild summers. Temperatures can drop below −20 °C with wind chill factors  below −30 °C. Precipitation runoff from the mountain and meltwater from the Spokane Glacier drains east into Cooper Creek, a tributary of the Duncan River.

See also

Geography of British Columbia

References

Cooper
Cooper
Cooper
Kootenay Land District